James Kent may refer to:

James Kent (jurist) (1763–1847), American jurist and legal scholar
James Kent (composer) (1700–1776), English composer
James Kent, better known as Perturbator, French electronic/synthwave musician
James Tyler Kent (1849–1916), American physician and pioneer of homeopathy
Jim Kent (born 1960), American research scientist and computer programmer
James Kent (chef), American chef and winner of Bocuse d'Or USA 2010
Jim Kent (politician) (1885–1970), New Zealand politician of the Labour Party
James C. Kent (born 1941), judge in the Canadian province of Ontario
James M. Kent  (1872–1939), Newfoundland lawyer, judge and politician
Jim Kent (The Strain), fictional character
James Kent (consultant), British management consultant
James Kent (director), TV and film director